El Gouna ("the Lagoon") is an Egyptian tourist city, owned and developed by Samih Sawiris' Orascom Development, dating from 1989. It is part of the Red Sea Riviera, and a host city of the El Gouna Film Festival.

El Gouna has 10 kilometers of coastline and consists of 20 islands surrounded by lagoons. The town is 25 kilometers away from the Hurghada International Airport.

El Gouna buildings were designed by European and American architects to resemble traditional rural Egyptian architecture such as that found in the Egyptian countryside and in Nubian villages. El Gouna specializes in water-sports. There are several beaches: including Zeytuna Beach located on its own island, Mangroovy Beach, Moods Beach and other hotel beaches. 

There are three main areas in El Gouna, Downtown, Tamr Henna Square and the Abu Tig Marina.

It also has a mosque and a Coptic church, the Church of St. Mary and the Archangels.

In 2017 an annual film festival was established, the El Gouna Film Festival.

Climate
The weather in El Gouna is sunny all year long. Humidity is 22% on average.
Köppen-Geiger climate classification system classifies its climate as hot desert (BWh).

See also
 Red Sea Riviera
 Marsa Alam
 Sahl Hasheesh
 List of cities and towns in Egypt

References

External links

 Official website

Hotels in Egypt
Hurghada
Seaside resorts in Egypt
Tourism in Egypt
Architecture in Egypt
Red Sea Riviera
Underwater diving sites in Egypt
Underwater diving resorts